Jepson may refer to:


Buildings in the United States
 Jepson Center for the Arts in Savannah, Georgia
 Jepson Herbarium, Botanical Natural History Museum, University of California, Berkeley
 on the University of Richmond campus:
 Jepson Hall 
 Alice Andrews Jepson Theater
 Jepson Alumni Center

Places in the United States
 Jepson Island, Connecticut
 Jepson Peak, a mountain in Southern California's San Bernardino Mountains
 Jepson Prairie, a protected prairie in the Sacramento Valley of California
 Mount Jepson, a mountain along the border between California's Inyo and Fresno counties

People
 Jepson (surname), including a list of people

Other uses
 Jepson Art Institute, Los Angeles, California, USA
 Jepson's Farm and Jepson's Gate of Anglezarke, a civil parish in Lancashire, England
 The Jepson Laurel, the oldest known living laurel tree
 The Jepson Manual, California plant identification often referred to as simply Jepson
 Jepson School of Leadership Studies, University of Richmond, Virginia, USA
 Harry Jepson Trophy, a rugby trophy
 Jepson Way, the grounds of A.F.C. Blackpool

See also
 Jepson claim, in United States patent law, a claim where one or more limitations are specifically identified as a point of novelty
 Jepsen
 Jepsonia
 Jeppo (disambiguation)